"A Mighty Fortress Is Our God" (originally written in the German language with the title ) is one of the best known hymns by the Protestant Reformer Martin Luther, a prolific hymnwriter. Luther wrote the words and composed the hymn tune between 1527 and 1529. It has been translated into English at least seventy times and also into many other languages. The words are mostly original, although the first line paraphrases that of Psalm 46.

History 
"A Mighty Fortress" is one of the best known hymns of the Lutheran tradition, and among Protestants more generally. It has been called the "Battle Hymn of the Reformation" for the effect it had in increasing the support for the Reformers' cause. John Julian records four theories of its origin:

 Heinrich Heine: "Ein feste Burg ist unser Gott" was sung by Luther and his companions as they entered Worms on 16 April 1521 for the Diet;
 K. F. T. Schneider: it was a tribute to Luther's friend Leonhard Kaiser, who was executed on 16 August 1527;
 Jean-Henri Merle d'Aubigné: it was sung by the German Lutheran princes as they entered Augsburg for the Diet in 1530, at which the Augsburg Confession was presented; and
 Some scholars believe that Luther composed it in connection with the Diet of Speyer (1529), at which the German Lutheran princes lodged their protest to Holy Roman Emperor  Charles V, who wanted to enforce his 1521 Edict of Worms.

Alternatively, John M. Merriman writes that the hymn "began as a martial song to inspire soldiers against the Ottoman forces" during the Ottoman wars in Europe.

The earliest extant hymnal in which it appears is that of Andrew Rauscher (1531). It is believed to have been included in Joseph Klug's Wittenberg hymnal of 1529, of which no copy remains. Before that it is believed to have appeared in Hans Weiss Wittenberg's hymnal of 1528, also lost. This evidence supports Luther having written it between 1527 and 1529, because Luther's hymns were printed shortly after he wrote them.

A mighty Fortress is our God
A Bulwark never failing
Our Helper He amid the flood
Of mortal ills prevailing
For still our ancient foe
Doth seek to work us woe
His craft and power are great
And, armed with cruel hate
On earth is not his equal
Did we in our own strength confide
Our striving would be losing
Were not the right Man on our side
The Man of God's own choosing
Dost ask who that may be?
Christ Jesus, it is He
Lord Sabaoth His Name
From age to age, the same
And He must win the battle
And though this world, with devils filled
Should threaten to undo us
We will not fear, for God hath willed
His truth to triumph through us
The Prince of Darkness grim
We tremble not for him
His rage we can endure
For lo, his doom is sure
One little word shall fell him
That word above all earthly powers
No, thanks to them, abideth
The Spirit and the gifts are ours
Through Him who with us sideth
Let goods and kindred go
This mortal life also
The body they may kill
God's truth abideth still
His Kingdom is forever

Tune

Luther composed the melody, named  from the text's first line, in meter 87.87.55.56.7 (Zahn No. 7377a). This is sometimes denoted "rhythmic tune" to distinguish it from the later isometric variant, in 87.87.66.66.7-meter (Zahn No. 7377d), which is more widely known and used in Christendom. In 1906 Edouard Rœhrich wrote, "The authentic form of this melody differs very much from that which one sings in most Protestant churches and figures in (Giacomo Meyerbeer's) The Huguenots. ...

While 19th-century musicologists disputed Luther's authorship of the music to the hymn, that opinion has been modified by more recent research; it is now the consensus view of musical scholars that Luther did indeed compose the famous tune to go with the words.

Reception 
Heinrich Heine wrote in his 1834 essay , a history of emancipation in Germany beginning with the Reformation, that  was the Marseillaise of the Reformation. This "imagery of battle" is also present in some translations, such as that of Thomas Carlyle (which begins "A safe stronghold our God is still"). In Germany, "Ein feste Burg ist unser Gott" was historically also used as a patriotic paean, which is why it was regularly sung at nationalistic events such as the Wartburg Festival in 1817. This patriotic undertone of the hymn emanates from its importance for the Reformation in general, which was regarded by the Protestants not only as a religious but as a national movement delivering Germany from Roman oppression. Furthermore, the last line of the fourth stanza of the German text, "Das Reich muss uns doch bleiben," which is generally translated into English as "The Kingdom's ours forever," referring to the Kingdom of God, may also be interpreted as meaning the Holy Roman Empire must remain with the Germans.

The song is reported to have been used as a battle anthem during the Thirty Years War by forces under King Gustavus Adolphus, Lutheran king of Sweden. This idea was exploited by some 19th-century poets, such as Karl Curths, although there exists no primary source which supports this. The hymn had been translated into Swedish already in 1536, presumably by Olaus Petri, with the incipit, "Vår Gud är oss en väldig borg". In the late 19th century the song also became an anthem of the early Swedish socialist movement.

In addition to being consistently popular throughout Western Christendom  in Protestant hymnbooks, it is now a suggested hymn for Catholic Masses in the U.S., and appears in the Catholic Book of Worship published by the Canadian Catholic Conference in 1972. The eventful history and reception of A Mighty Fortress Is Our God has been presented interactively in Lutherhaus Eisenach’s revamped permanent exhibition since 2022.

English translations 
The first English translation was by Myles Coverdale in 1539 with the title, "Oure God is a defence and towre". The first English translation in "common usage" was "God is our Refuge in Distress, Our strong Defence" in J.C. Jacobi's Psal. Ger., 1722, p. 83.

An English version less literal in translation but more popular among Protestant denominations outside Lutheranism is "A mighty fortress is our God, a bulwark never failing", translated by Frederick H. Hedge in 1853. Another popular English translation is by Thomas Carlyle and begins "A safe stronghold our God is still".

Most North American Lutheran churches have not historically used either the Hedge or Carlyle translations. Traditionally, the most commonly used translation in Lutheran congregations is a composite translation from the 1868 Pennsylvania Lutheran Church Book ("A mighty fortress is our God, a trusty shield and weapon"). In more recent years a new translation completed for the 1978 Lutheran Book of Worship ("A mighty fortress is our God, a sword and shield victorious") has also gained significant popularity.

Compositions based on the hymn 

The hymn has been used by numerous composers, including Johann Sebastian Bach. There is a version for organ, BWV 720, written early in his career, possibly for the organ at Divi Blasii, Mühlhausen.
He used the hymn as the basis of his chorale cantata Ein feste Burg ist unser Gott, BWV 80 written for a celebration of Reformation Day. Bach also set the tune twice in his Choralgesänge (Choral Hymns), BWV 302 and BWV 303 (for four voices). Two orchestrations of Bach's settings were made by conductors Leopold Stokowski and Walter Damrosch. Dieterich Buxtehude also wrote an organ chorale setting (BuxWV 184), as did Johann Pachelbel. George Frideric Handel used fragments of the melody in his oratorio Solomon. Georg Philipp Telemann also made a choral arrangement of this hymn and prominently used an extract of the verses beginning Mit unsrer Macht ist nichts getan in his famous Donnerode.

Felix Mendelssohn used it as the theme for the fourth and final movement of his Symphony No. 5, Op. 107 (1830), which he named Reformation in honor of the Reformation started by Luther. Joachim Raff wrote an Overture (for orchestra), Ein feste Burg ist unser Gott, Op. 127. Giacomo Meyerbeer quoted it in his five-act grand opera Les Huguenots (1836), and Richard Wagner used it as a "motive" in his "Kaisermarsch" ("Emperor's March"), which was composed to commemorate the return of Kaiser Wilhelm I from the Franco-Prussian War in 1871. Two organ settings were written by Max Reger: his chorale fantasia Ein' feste Burg ist unser Gott, Op. 27, and a much shorter chorale prelude as No. 6 of his 52 Chorale Preludes, Op. 67, in 1902. Claude Debussy quoted the theme in his suite for piano duet, En blanc et noir. Alexander Glazunov quoted the melody in his Finnish Fantasy, Op. 88.

Ralph Vaughan Williams used the tune in his score for the film 49th Parallel, most obviously when the German U-boat surfaces in Hudson Bay shortly after the beginning of the film. Flor Peeters wrote an organ chorale setting "Ein feste Burg" as part of his Ten Chorale Preludes, Op. 69, published in 1949. More recently it has been used by band composers to great effect in pieces such as Psalm 46 by John Zdechlik and The Holy War by Ray Steadman-Allen. The hymn also features in Luther, an opera by Kari Tikka that premiered in 2000. It has also been used by African-American composer Julius Eastman in his 1979 work Gay Guerrilla, composed for an undefined number of instruments and familiar in its recorded version for 4 pianos. Eastman's use of the hymn can arguably be seen as simultaneously a claim for inclusion in the tradition of "classical" composition, as well as a subversion of that very same tradition.

Mauricio Kagel quoted the hymn, paraphrased as "Ein feste Burg ist unser Bach", in his oratorio Sankt-Bach-Passion, which tells Bach's life and was composed for the tricentenary of Bach's birth in 1985. Nancy Raabe composed a concertato on the hymn using organ, assembly, trumpet, and tambourine, the only such composition by a female composer.

See also 

 List of hymns by Martin Luther
 Psalm 46

References

Bibliography

 Commission on Worship of the Lutheran Church—Missouri Synod. Lutheran Worship. St. Louis: Concordia Publishing House, 1982. ISBN
 Julian, John, ed. A Dictionary of Hymnology: Setting forth the Origin and History of Christian Hymns of all Ages and Nations. Second revised edition. 2 vols. n.p., 1907. Reprint, New York: Dover Publications, Inc., 1957.
 Pelikan, Jaroslav and Lehmann, Helmut, eds. Luther's Works. Vol. 53, Liturgy and Hymns. St. Louis, Concordia Publishing House, 1965. .
 Polack, W. G. The Handbook to the Lutheran Hymnal. St. Louis: Concordia Publishing House, 1942.
 Rœhrich, E. Les Origines du Choral Luthérien. Paris: Librairie Fischbacher, 1906.
 Stulken, Marilyn Kay. Hymnal Companion to the Lutheran Book of Worship. Philadelphia: Fortress Press, 1981.

External links

 

"Ein feste Burg" sung by the Wartburg Choir (in German)
"A Mighty Fortress Is Our God" sung by the Choir of King's College, Cambridge
"Ein feste Burg" sung in the original rhythm (Evangelische Landeskirche in Württemberg) (in German)

1529 works
16th-century Christian texts
16th-century hymns in German
A Mighty Fortress Is Our God
Hymn tunes
Hymns by Martin Luther
German patriotic songs